The Politician is an American comedy-drama streaming television series created by Ryan Murphy, Brad Falchuk, and Ian Brennan and released on Netflix. The trio also serves as executive producers with Alexis Martin Woodall, Ben Platt, and Gwyneth Paltrow. The series centers on the story of Payton Hobart (Platt), a wealthy Santa Barbaran, and each season revolves around a different political race his character is involved in.

The first season was released on Netflix on September 27, 2019. The series stars Ben Platt, Zoey Deutch, Lucy Boynton, Bob Balaban, Laura Dreyfuss, Julia Schlaepfer, Theo Germaine, Rahne Jones and Gwyneth Paltrow. David Corenswet, Benjamin Barrett, and Jessica Lange joined the main cast in the first season, while Judith Light and Bette Midler joined the main cast in the second season. Production on the second season started in November 2019, which premiered on June 19, 2020.

Premise
The first season is set at the fictional Saint Sebastian High School in Santa Barbara, California. Payton Hobart, who has dreamed of being elected President of the United States since childhood, is running for student body president against the popular and athletic River Barkley. Payton, under the direction of his ambitious friends McAfee Westbrook, James Sullivan, and Alice Charles, chooses Infinity Jackson, a cancer patient and victim of Munchausen by Proxy disorder, to be his vice-president. Meanwhile, River, under the direction of his girlfriend Astrid Sloan, chooses Skye Leighton, a gender-nonconforming black classmate, to be his vice-president.

The second season is set in New York City and Albany, New York. Payton, now a student at New York University, is running for a seat in the New York State Senate against incumbent Majority Leader Dede Standish. Payton, under the direction of his former classmates and climate change activist Infinity Jackson, runs an ecocentric campaign. Standish, under the direction of her conniving campaign manager Hadassah Gold, runs a more conservative campaign. Meanwhile, Payton's mother, Georgina Hobart, is running to be Governor of California.

Cast and characters

Main

 Ben Platt as Payton Hobart, an ambitious man who ran for student body president at St. Sebastian and later for State Senate of New York
 Zoey Deutch as Infinity Jackson, Payton's former running mate who becomes an activist for the environment
 Lucy Boynton as Astrid Sloan, Payton's rival and River's former girlfriend
 Bob Balaban as Keaton Hobart (season 1), Payton's adoptive father
 David Corenswet as River Barkley (season 1; recurring season 2), Payton's opponent for student body president and ex-boyfriend
 Julia Schlaepfer as Alice Charles, Payton's girlfriend and later fiancée
 Laura Dreyfuss as McAfee Westbrook, Payton's campaign manager and advisor
 Theo Germaine as James Sullivan, Payton's campaign manager and advisor
 Rahne Jones as Skye Leighton, River's former running mate who is now helping Payton with his New York campaign
 Benjamin Barrett as Ricardo (season 1; guest season 2), Infinity's former dim-witted boyfriend
 Jessica Lange as Dusty Jackson (season 1), Infinity's grandmother and former caretaker
 Gwyneth Paltrow as Georgina Hobart, Payton's adoptive mother.
 Judith Light as Dede Standish (season 2; guest season 1), the New York State Senate Majority Leader
 Bette Midler as Hadassah Gold (season 2; guest season 1), Dede's Chief of Staff

Recurring
 Ryan J. Haddad as Andrew Cashman, a former student with cerebral palsy at St. Sebastian who is now helping Payton with his New York campaign
 Kobi Kumi-Diaka as Pierre Toussaint (season 1), the only Haitian student studying at St. Sebastian
 Trevor Mahlon Eason as Martin Hobart, one of Payton's brothers
 Trey Eason as Luther Hobart, one of Payton's brothers
 Natasha Ofili as Principal Vaughn (season 1), the Principal at St. Sebastian who is registered deaf
 B.K. Cannon as Kris
 Martina Navratilova as Brigitte (season 1), a horse trainer who is also Georgina's lover
 Dylan McDermott as Theo Sloan (season 1), Astrid's father
 January Jones as Lisbeth Sloan (season 1), Astrid's mother
 Sam Jaeger as Tino McCutcheon (season 2; guest season 1), the Junior Senator-Elect from Texas.
 Joe Morton as Marcus Standish (season 2; guest season 1), Dede's husband
 Teddy Sears as William Ward (season 2; guest season 1), the third in Dede and Marcus' throuple
 Jackie Hoffman as Sherry Dougal (season 2; guest season 1), the receptionist at Dede Standish's campaign office

Guest
 Jordan Nichole Wall as Ivy (season 1), girl with Down syndrome on school bus
 Rick Holmes as Cooper (season 1)
 Eric Nenninger as Detective (season 1)
 Rudy Pankow as Other Kid (season 1)
 Russell Posner as Elliot Beachman (season 1)
 Jake Tapper as himself, a CNN correspondent and moderator for the gubernatorial debate. 
 Terry Sweeney as Buddy Broidy (season 1)
 Robin Weigert as Andi Mueller (season 2)
 Susannah Perkins as Jayne Mueller (season 2)

Episodes

Season 1 (2019)

Season 2 (2020)

Production

Development
On February 5, 2018, it was announced that Netflix had given the production a two season order. The order came after a bidding war involving Hulu and Amazon. The series was created by Brad Falchuk, Ian Brennan and Ryan Murphy, all of whom will executive produce alongside Ben Platt. Production companies involved with the show include Fox 21 Television Studios and Ryan Murphy Productions.

Casting
Alongside the initial series announcement, it was confirmed that Ben Platt would star in the series and that Barbra Streisand and Gwyneth Paltrow were in talks to join as series regulars. On July 16, 2018, it was announced that Zoey Deutch, Lucy Boynton, Laura Dreyfuss and Rahne Jones had been cast in main roles. On October 11, 2018, it was reported that Dylan McDermott had joined the cast. On November 4, 2018, Streisand revealed in an interview with The New Yorker that she had chosen to turn down the series in order to work on her album Walls, and that Jessica Lange had been cast in the role she had been eyed for instead. On December 3, 2018, McDermott announced in an interview with Sirius XM that January Jones had been cast to portray his wife in the series. In March 2019, it was announced Bette Midler and Judith Light would guest star in the series.

Filming
Principal photography for the first season took place on location in Fullerton Union High School, Orange County, California, and Los Angeles, California.

Reception

Critical response

The review aggregator website Rotten Tomatoes reported a 58% approval rating for the first season with an average rating of 6.74/10, based on 91 reviews. The website's critical consensus reads: "While The Politician can't uphold all of its tantalizing promises, it delivers just enough soapy satire in a sumptuous setting to keep Ryan Murphy fans invested—though its [sic] unlikely to win him many new votes." Metacritic, which uses a weighted average, assigned the season a score of 66 out of 100, based on 32 critics, indicating "generally favorable reviews".

On Rotten Tomatoes, the second season received a 40% approval rating with an average rating of 5.84/10, based on 20 reviews. The website's critical consensus reads: "Shallow and messy, but not in a fun way, The Politician's second term expands its political horizons but doesn't seem to know what to do with them." Metacritic gave the second season a weighted average score of 46 out of 100 based on 8 reviews, indicating "mixed or average reviews".

Accolades

See also
 The Politician (soundtrack)

References

External links
 
 

2010s American comedy-drama television series
2010s American high school television series
2010s American LGBT-related comedy television series
2010s American LGBT-related drama television series
2010s American political comedy television series
2010s American satirical television series
2010s American teen drama television series
2019 American television series debuts
2020 American television series endings
2020s American comedy-drama television series
2020s American LGBT-related comedy television series
2020s American LGBT-related drama television series
2020s American political comedy television series
2020s American satirical television series
2020s American teen drama television series
Bisexuality-related television series
English-language Netflix original programming
Political satirical television series
Polyamory in fiction
Television series about teenagers
Television series by 20th Century Fox Television
Television series created by Ryan Murphy (writer)
Television shows filmed in Los Angeles
Television shows set in New York City
Television shows set in Santa Barbara, California